No 211 Group or No. 211 (Medium Bomber) Group was a Group of the Royal Air Force (RAF) formed on 10 December 1941 by renaming Nucleus Group Western Desert.  The group was officially disbanded from 3 February 1942 to 12 March 1943, although some references refer to some of its original squadrons during this period as being with 211 Group. On 12 March 1943, the group reformed as No. 211 (Offensive Fighter) Group and Air Commodore Richard Atcherley assumed command of the group on 11 April 1943. At this time, 211 Group was the principle fighter force of the Desert Air Force (DAF) commanded by Air Vice Marshal Harry Broadhurst, and DAF was a sub-command of Air Marshal Sir Arthur Coningham's Northwest African Tactical Air Force (NATAF).

The group included many units from the South African Air Force (SAAF), as well as several from the Royal Australian Air Force (RAAF) and the United States Army Air Forces (USAAF), with one each from the Hellenic Air Force and Royal Canadian Air Force. Many personnel from other British Commonwealth air forces also served in RAF, SAAF, RAAF and RCAF units, under the British Commonwealth Air Training Plan and related arrangements.

Throughout the North African Campaign, the medium bomber and fighter squadrons of Air Headquarters Western Desert, also known at various times of the campaign as Air Headquarters Libya, Western Desert Air Force, or DAF, were primarily assigned to either 211 Group or No. 212 (Fighter Control) Group (later No. 212 (Fighter) Group).

Order of battle 1942 and 1943
Group assignments for squadrons during the campaigns in Egypt, Libya, and Tunisia are for the period from July 1942 to 10 July 1943 when the Allies invaded Sicily (Operation Husky).

Notes
SAAF – South African Air Force, RAAF – Royal Australian Air Force, RCAF – Royal Canadian Air Force; RNZAF -Royal New Zealand Air Force; PRU- Photographic Reconnaissance Unit; Sqns=Squadrons.

^The 57th Fighter Group USAAF had the 64th, 65th, and 66th; and the 79th Fighter Group USAAF had the 85th, 86th, and 87th Fighter Squadrons. For Operation Husky, the 57th and 79th Groups, No. 239 Wing, and some other units, made up the Rear Headquarters of DAF in Tripoli, Libya while the rest of 211 Group (Nos 244, 322, & 324 Wings) made up the Advanced Headquarters of DAF on the island of Malta.

Operations

Spitfires of No. 92 Squadron RAF and P-40F Warhawks of the 64th Fighter Squadron USAAF flew top cover for the P-40F Warhawks of the 65th and 66th Fighter Squadron and 314th Fighter Squadron (attached from the 324th Fighter Group), during the Palm Sunday Massacre of 18 April 1943.  The three USAAF Warhawk Squadrons destroyed approximately 70 Axis aircraft that day.

Notes

References
 Craven, Wesley F. and James L. Cate. The Army Air Forces in World War II, Volume 2, Chicago, Illinois: Chicago University Press, 1949 (Reprinted 1983).
 Richards, D. and H. Saunders, The Royal Air Force 1939–1945 (Volume 2, HMSO, 1953).
 Howe, George F., Northwest Africa: Seizing the Initiative in the West, Center of Military History, Washington, DC., 1991.
 Army Air Forces Historical Office Headquarters, Participation of the Ninth & Twelfth Air Forces in the Sicilian Campaign, Army Air Forces Historical Study No. 37, Maxwell Air Force Base, Alabama, 1945.
 Air of Authority – a history of RAF organization.

Royal Air Force groups
Royal Air Force groups of the Second World War
Military units and formations established in 1941